Mats Karlsson (born August 12, 1956) is a ten-pin bowler from Gothenburg, Sweden who competed internationally and on the PBA Tour in the United States.

Karlsson became the first international player to win a PBA Tour event when he captured the 1986 Southern California Open in Riverside, California.  He went on to win three PBA titles.  Internationally, he won the 1991 AMF World Open and 10 medals in the FIQ World Championships.

In 2009, Karlsson was honored as the best male bowler in 100 years of organized bowling in Sweden, during ceremonies held in Stockholm.

References

Swedish ten-pin bowling players
1956 births
Living people
Sportspeople from Gothenburg